Abel Adams (born Aapeli Korhonen, 14 March 1879 – 14 July 1938) was a Finnish film producer and the founder of Adams Filmi. He was born in Karttula and, in the 1930s, ran the largest chain of cinemas in Finland. After his death in Helsinki in 1938, Adams Filmi stopped producing films for ten years.

Filmography
Meren ja lemmen aallot (1926)
Taistelu Heikkilän talosta (1936)
Nuorena nukkunut (1937)
Kiusaus (1938)

References

External links

1879 births
1938 deaths
People from Karttula
People from Kuopio Province (Grand Duchy of Finland)
Finnish emigrants to the United States
Finnish film producers